Tomizawa (written: 富沢 or 富澤) is a Japanese surname. Notable people with the surname include:

, Japanese high jumper
, Japanese manga artist
, Japanese footballer
, Japanese windsurfer
, Japanese footballer
, Japanese voice actress and singer
, Japanese motorcycle racer
, Japanese comedian and actor

See also
Tomizawa Station, a metro station in Sendai, Miyagi Prefecture, Japan

Japanese-language surnames